La Cigale is a brasserie located in Nantes, France, on the same city square as the Théâtre Graslin. The locale has been classified as a historic monument since 1964.

History 
The restaurant was designed by the architect/ceramicist Émile Libaudière in the exaggerated Art nouveau style of the era.  On 1 April 1895, the brasserie was opened for business by its first owner, Mrs. Calado.

From the beginning the restaurant attracted a bourgeois clientele that mixed with artists from the nearby theater.  The surrealists Jacques Prévert and André Breton were regular patrons.  Scenes from several films have been shot there, including Jacques Demy's 1961 film Lola,  Debout les crabes, la mer monte ! by Jean-Jacques Grand-Jouan (1983), and Jacquot de Nantes by Agnès Varda (1991).

In 1964, the brasserie was turned into a fast-food restaurant, but the decor remained unchanged due to the protections afforded by its status as a historical monument.  During the 1970s the restaurant was neglected and eventually abandoned, until a new owner turned it back into a brasserie in 1982.

Gallery

References 

Art Nouveau architecture in France
Tourist attractions in Nantes
Art Nouveau restaurants
Restaurants established in 1895
Companies based in Pays de la Loire
Buildings and structures in Nantes
1895 establishments in France